Záhorská Ves (previous name: Uhorská Ves;  is a village situated north of Bratislava, the capital city of Slovakia. It is part of the Malacky District and Bratislava Region. The village is located on the Morava river, which forms the border between Slovakia and Austria. A river ferry operates between the village and Angern an der March in Austria

Záhorská Ves is the westernmost settlement in Slovakia and is located near the westernmost point in Slovakia.

Záhorská Ves has a population of 1,632 and area of 13.06 km2 at an altitude of 149 m.

The settlement was first mentioned in 1557. Opera singer Lucia Popp was born there in 1939.

References

External links

Official website of Záhorská Ves

Villages and municipalities in Malacky District
Austria–Slovakia border crossings